Shoup may refer to:

Shoup (surname), a list of people
Shoup, Idaho, United States, an unincorporated community
Shoup Rock Shelters, two prehistoric rock shelters in Lemhi County, Idaho
, a United States Navy guided-missile destroyer in commission since 2002
, a coastal freighter
Shoup's Mountain Battery, a Confederate Civil War unit
Shoup Voting Machine Corporation
Shoup Building, Salmon, Idaho, United States, on the National Register of Historic Places

See also
Shoop (disambiguation)